Bad Hair may refer to:
 Bad Hair (2013 film), a Venezuelan drama film
 Bad Hair (2020 film), an American satirical comedy horror film
 Bad Hair (album), a 2016 album by Nasty C

See also
 Bad Hair Day (disambiguation)